The October 2006 Yakima hops fire was a large-scale fire that destroyed a significant amount of the US total hops production, in a warehouse located in Yakima, Washington.

The fire started shortly before noon local time on October 2, 2006, in a 40,000-square-foot (3,600-square-meter) warehouse operated by S.S. Steiner Inc., one of the four largest hop buyers in the Yakima Valley of central Washington. By mid-afternoon, flames engulfed most of the building.

The fire destroyed or ruined about 10,000 bales, each weighing about 200 pounds (90 kilograms) and likely worth $1.75 to $2 a pound.

It is estimated this represents about four percent of the total US production.

References
 

Warehouse fires
Industrial fires and explosions in the United States
Fires in Washington (state)
2006 fires in the United States
2006 in Washington (state)
Humulus